Sima is a surname. People with the name include:

Chinese surnames

European surnames 
 Gabriela Sima (1955–2016), Austrian opera singer
 Hans Sima (1918–2006), Austrian politician
 Jonas Sima (born 1937), Swedish filmmaker, journalist, writer and educator
 Josef Šíma (1891–1971), Czech painter
 Oskar Sima (1896–1969), Austrian actor
 Horia Sima (1907–1993), Romanian fascist politician
 Michel Sima (1912–1987), photographer and sculptor
 Viorel Sima (born 1950), Romanian footballer

See also
 Sima disambiguation page

Romanian-language surnames